Boykin, South Carolina may refer to:
Boykin, Kershaw County, South Carolina, a census-designated place
 Battle of Boykin's Mill, fought between Union and Confederate forces in Kershaw County (1865)
 Boykin Mill Complex, Kershaw County
Boykin, Marlboro County, South Carolina, an unincorporated community